Freisler (also spelled Freissler) is a German surname. Notable people with the surname include:

 Anton Freissler (1838–1916), Austrian elevator manufacturer
 Fritz Freisler (1881–1955), Austrian screenwriter and film director
 Marion Freisler (1910–1997), wife of Roland Freisler
 Oswald Freisler (1895–1939), German lawyer and brother of Roland Freisler
 Roland Freisler (1893–1945), German jurist

German-language surnames
Surnames from nicknames